Leo White (November 10, 1873 – September 20, 1948), was a German-born British-American film and stage actor who appeared as a character actor in many Charlie Chaplin films.

Biography
Born in Germany, White grew up in England where he began his stage career. He was brought to the United States under the aegis of Daniel Frohman, a Broadway producer. He started his film career in 1911 and in 1913 moved to the Essanay Studios. In 1915, he began appearing in Chaplin's comedies and continued through Chaplin's Mutual Film comedies. His last appearance in a Chaplin film was a small role in The Great Dictator, released in 1940.

White also acted in and directed Triple Trouble (1918), Essanay's last Chaplin release. Chaplin himself acknowledged Triple Trouble in his autobiography but did not actually participate in its production. (White filmed new scenes around existing footage of Chaplin.)

White typically played dapper, continental villains or noblemen in films, and this typecast him for the rest of his screen career. Well into the 1940s, he was still playing excitable Frenchmen in short subjects and feature films. Before his death in 1948, White had appeared in over 400 films. 

White died in Glendale, California, of a heart attack at the age of 74 on September 20, 1948. He was interred at Grand View Memorial Park Cemetery in Glendale.

Filmography

 In and Out (1914, Short) - Fritz
 One Wonderful Night (1914) - Jean de Curtois
 Leading Lizzie Astray (1914, Short) - Cafe Patron (uncredited)
 Madame Double X (1914, Short)
 Fatty's Faithful Fido (1915, Short)
 His New Job (1915, Short) - Office Receptionist / Actor as Hussar Officer (uncredited)
 A Night Out (1915, Short) - 'French' Dandy / Desk Clerk (uncredited)
 The Champion (1915, Short) - Crooked Gambler (uncredited)
 In the Park (1915, Short) - The Count - Elegant Masher (uncredited)
 A Jitney Elopement (1915, Short) - Count Chloride de Lime - Edna's Suitor (uncredited)
 The Tramp (1915, Short) - First Thief (uncredited)
 Work (1915, Short) - The Secret Lover (uncredited)
 A Woman (1915, Short) - Idler in the Park (uncredited)
 The Bank (1915, Short) - Clerk (uncredited)
 Shanghaied (1915, Short) - Third Shanghaied Seaman (uncredited)
 A Night in the Show (1915, Short) - Frenchman / Negro in Balcony (uncredited)
 Police (1916, Short) - Fruitseller / Flop House Manager / Policeman (uncredited)
 The Floorwalker (1916, Short) - Elegant Customer
 The Fireman (1916, Short) - Owner of the Burning House
 The Vagabond (1916, Short) - Old Gypsy woman
 The Count (1916, Short) - Count Broko (uncredited)
 Max Wants a Divorce (1917, Short) - Loony Dancer (uncredited)
 Back Stage (1917, Short) 
 The Hero (1917, Short) - The Count
 Dough Nuts (1917, Short) - Camembert, the Proprietor
 Cupid's Rival (1917, Short) - Rich Artist
 The Villain (1917, Short)
 The Millionaire (1917, Short)
 The Goat (1917, Short)
 The Fly Cop (1917, Short) - The Mayor
 The Chief Cook (1917, Short) - Ham
 The Candy Kid (1917, Short)
 The Hobo (1917, Short) - Mr. Fox
 The Pest (1917, Short) - The Count
 The Slave (1917, Short) - The Vizier
 The Stranger (1918, Short) - The Greaser
 His Day Out (1918, Short)
 The Rogue (1918, Short) - The Count
 The Orderly (1918, Short)
 Amarilly of Clothes-Line Alley (1918) - Manicurist (uncredited)
 The Scholar (1918, Short)
 The Messenger (1918, Short)
 The Handy Man (1918, Short)
 Bright and Early (1918, Short) - An honest crook
 The Straight and Narrow (1918, Short) - Safecracker
 Triple Trouble (1918, Short) - Count (uncredited)
 The Brazen Beauty (1918) - Tony Dewey
 He's in Again (1918, Short) - The Prize Fighter
 Blind Youth (1920) - French Louis
 An Adventuress (1920) - Prince Halbere
 Fists and Fodder (1920, Short) - A Rival
 Mrs. Temple's Telegram (1920) - John Brown
 Pals and Pugs (1920, Short) - Beau Brummel
 The Devil's Pass Key (1920) - Amadeus Malot
 You Never Can Tell (1920) - Mr. Renan
 Married to Order (1920, Short) - The Milkman
 The Rookie's Return (1920) - Henri
 Her Sturdy Oak (1921) - Archibald Mellon
 Keeping Up with Lizzie (1921) - Count Louis Roland
 The Rage of Paris (1921) - Jean Marot
 Headin' West (1922) - Honey Giroux
 Beyond the Rocks (1922) - Pageant Director (uncredited)
 Blood and Sand (1922) - Antonio
 Breaking Into Society (1923)
 Why Worry? (1923)
 In Search of a Thrill (1923)
 Sporting Youth (1924)
 When a Girl Loves (1924)
 Charley's Aunt (1925)
 An Enemy Of Men (1925)
 One Year to Live (1925)
 The Tower of Lies (1925)
 The Masked Bride (1925)
 Ben-Hur (1925) - Sanballat
 A Desperate Moment (1926)
 The Girl from Montmartre (1926)
 The Far Cry (1926)
 The Beautiful Cheat (1926)
 The Blonde Saint (1926)
 On the Front Page (1926)
 See You in Jail (1927)
 The Girl from Gay Paree (1927)
 A Hero for a Night (1927)
 How to Handle Women (1928)
 Manhattan Knights (1928)
 Thunder Riders (1928)
 Our Blushing Brides (1930)
 Sin Takes a Holiday (1930)
 Call of the Flesh (1930)
 Anna Christie (1930)
 Monkey Business (1931)
 This Modern Age (1931)
 The Beast of the City (1932)
 Arsène Lupin (1932)
 Grand Hotel (1932)
 Rasputin and the Empress (1932)
 Lady for a Day (1933) 
 The Kennel Murder Case (1933)
 The Invisible Man (1933) 
 Meet the Baron (1933) uncredited, as chef
 Viva Villa! (1934) 
 The Scarlet Empress (1934) 
 The Thin Man (1934)
 British Agent (1934)
 Black Fury (1935)
 The Case of the Curious Bride (1935)
 A Night at the Opera (1935)
 The Walking Dead (1936)
 Bullets or Ballots (1936)
 Satan Met a Lady (1936)
 Cain and Mabel (1936)
 The Prince and the Pauper (1937)
 Marked Woman (1937)
 Charlie Chan at Monte Carlo (1937)
 Tovarich (1937)
 Angels with Dirty Faces (1938) 
 Four's a Crowd (1938) 
 Nancy Drew... Reporter (1939) 
 Nancy Drew... Trouble Shooter (1939) 
 Each Dawn I Die (1939) 
 Blackmail (1939) 
 The Roaring Twenties (1939) 
 An Angel from Texas (1940) 
 Gambling on the High Seas (1940)
 The Sea Hawk  (1940) 
 City for Conquest (1940) 
 The Great Dictator (1940)
 The Letter (1940)
 Meet John Doe (1941) 
 The Great Lie (1941)
 Million Dollar Baby (1941) 
 Dangerously They Live (1941) 
 All Through the Night (1941) 
 Yankee Doodle Dandy (1942)
 The Gay Sisters (1942)
 Eatin' on the Cuff or The Moth Who Came to Dinner (1942) - Piano-Playing Narrator (uncredited) - voice dubbed by Mel Blanc 
 George Washington Slept Here (1942) 
 Gentleman Jim (1942) 
 Casablanca (1942) - Emile - Waiter (uncredited)
 Background to Danger (1943) 
 Appointment in Berlin (1943)
 Northern Pursuit (1943) 
 Mr. Skeffington (1944) 
 The Adventures of Mark Twain (1944) 
 Arsenic and Old Lace (1944) - Man in Phone Booth 
 Hotel Berlin (1945) 
 Lady on a Train (1945)
 Devotion (1946) 
 Night and Day (1946) 
 A Stolen Life (1946) 
 Cloak and Dagger (1946)
 The Verdict (1946) 
 The Unfaithful (1947) 
 My Wild Irish Rose (1947)
 Silver River (1948)
 Winter Meeting (1948)
 My Dream Is Yours (1949)
 Look for the Silver Lining (1949) 
 The Fountainhead (1949)

References

External links

brief article on Leo White as a Laurel & Hardy player

1882 births
1948 deaths
American male film actors
American male silent film actors
German emigrants to the United States
People from Grudziądz
People from West Prussia
20th-century American male actors